Ye Antientist Burial Ground is a cemetery in New London, Connecticut, bounded by Hempstead Street on the west and Huntington Street on the east, running from Granite Street to approximately Bristol Street.  It has been known by several names over the years, many spelling variations on Ancient Burial Ground. It is one of the earliest graveyards in New England and the oldest colonial cemetery in New London County. The hillside lot of 1.5 acres (6,000 m2) and adjoins the site of New London's first meeting house. The settlement at the time was called "Pequot Plantation" until the name changed in 1658.  From the burial grounds, the visitor has a broad view to the east of the Thames River and, on the far shore, the heights of Groton, Connecticut.

History
The lot had been reserved for a burying ground and recorded as such in the summer of 1645. The first decedent "of mature age" was duly interred there in 1652. But it is the ordinance of June 6, 1653 that legally sets the place apart and declares, "It shall ever bee for a Common Buriall place, and never be impropriated by any."

A later record notes the appointment of the sexton:

Whose work is to order youth in the meeting-house, sweep the meeting-house, and beat out dogs, for which he is to have 40s. a year : he is also to make all graves ; for a man or woman he is to have 4s., for children, 2s. a grave, to be paid by survivors .

17th century New London was yet a rough and isolated corner of early colonial Connecticut. Private interments were not customary, and this was the only common burial place.

The dead were brought in from a distance of six or seven miles (11 km), either carried in hurdles, or borne on a bier upon men's shoulders; large companies assembling, and relieving each other at convenient distances .
Few of the early graves ever had inscribed markers. The New London of that time possessed no skilled stonecutters, and those early planters simply had not the means. A few surviving families did, however, seek to address the deficiency in later years. At least four stones dated in the 17th century have been found that could not have been placed before 1720 .
If the best man in the community was struck down, his companions could do no more to testify their regret, than to lay him reverently in the grave, and seal it with a rude granite ... broken with ponderous mallets from some neighboring ledge and wearily dragged with ropes to the place and laid over the remains to secure them from disturbance, and mark the spot where a brother was buried .
As time wore away the unadorned burial hillocks, the older were "covered over with fresh deposits of the dead, so that the numbers here cannot be estimated by the evidences that now remain. ... Yet here undoubtably  were deposited nearly the whole generation of our first settlers" .

Gravestones
During the early 1700s, Grave Carvers such as John Hartshorne and James Stanclift were carving quality grave markers that were placed in the yard.  Later in the century, Eastern Connecticut carvers such as Josiah Manning, David Lamb, Gershom Bartlett, and Johnathan Loomis carved stones of granite schist and carvers from the Portland/Middletown region such as the Thomas Johnson Family and later generations of Stanclifts carved markers of brownstone that can be seen in the yard today.  Many wealthy families purchased slate tombstones imported from the Boston area or coastal Rhode Island, delivered through the New London Port.  The work of carvers such as the Lamsons of Charlestown Massachusetts, the John Stevens Shop of Newport Rhode Island, and James Foster & Sons of Dorchester Mass can be found in this cemetery.

Notable burials
Note: There is no way of ascertaining which of the founding colonists might have unmarked graves in this burial ground.

Sarah Kemble Knight (1666–1727): Author (1704) of The Journal of Madame Knight. .
Gurdon Saltonstall (1666–1724): Governor of the Colony of Connecticut, 1708-1724.
Lucretia Harris Shaw (1737–1781): Wife of Captain Nathaniel Shaw, Jr. She turned her home into a hospital and nursed wounded and sick soldiers returning from the infamous British prison ships at Wallabout Bay . As a result, she contracted the Gaol Fever herself and succumbed. The New London chapter of the Daughters of the American Revolution is named in her honor, and her house, the Shaw-Perkins Mansion, has been preserved as the headquarters of the New London County Historical Society since 1907 .
Thomas Short (1682–1712): Printer (1710) of The Saybrook Platform.

Gallery

See also
 New London, Connecticut

References
Notes

Bibliography

 — Mrs. Shaw. (See entry for April 9, 1776.)

 

 — Historical sketch.
 — Early names of settlement and river.

 — Coordinates, elevation, and accepted place names.

Further reading

External links

 Research Guide to Cemetery Resources at the Connecticut State Library
 The Association for Gravestone Studies

Cemeteries in New London County, Connecticut
History of Connecticut
History of New England
Buildings and structures in New London, Connecticut
Tourist attractions in New London, Connecticut
1645 establishments in Connecticut